Lunds nation is one of thirteen student nations of Lund University, Sweden. With its 3,563 members, Lunds is the second-largest nation in Lund.

History 
The nation has its origins in one of the university's first nations, Skånska Nationen (named after, and composed of students from Scania) which existed from the late 1600s to 1833, when its size essentially forced the nation to split into multiple chapters. In 1889, it was decided that five of the chapters were to be reformed as Nations in their own right, dissolving Skånska Nationen. Thus, on January 1, 1890, the Nations that are known today by the names of Lunds, Malmö, Sydskånska, Kristianstad and Helsingkrona were formed.

During its first semester, Lunds had 67 members.

Housing

The Nation House 
Nationshuset ("The Nation House") was inaugurated in 1959 and is composed of Gamla Huset and Nya Huset ("the Old House" and "the New House", respectively). Its expansion, Nya Huset was built in 1967. The building houses Lunds' headquarters and main housing estate. It is located on Agahrdsgatan, on the southwestern corner of the enclosed block between the Botanical Garden and Stora Tomegatan. Together with 140 apartments, Lunds headquarters and basement is located in the building, the latter of which is the place where most of the nation's social activities take place. The building has a spacious courtyard in which a new housing development will be constructed by 2023. The new development is thus far unnamed but is planned to be a four-story building composed of 14 shared apartments and two one-room apartments. It will be attached with Nya Huset which in turn will also be expanded with additional dorm rooms in what is today its attic.

The Archive 
Another housing development of Lunds Nation is called Arkivet ("The Archive") and is located on Arkivgatan, just north of Ulrikedal. The house was built in 2014 and is composed of multiple apartments.

Events 
The nation's basement and rooftop bar are popular night club venues for students. Lunds nation also hosts regular brunches, lunches and semi-formal "sittning" dinners.

References 

Nations at Lund University
1890 establishments in Sweden